Tomo may refer to:

People

Surname
Angele Tomo (born 1989), Cameroonian freestyle wrestler
Sutomo (1920-1981), also known as Bung Tomo, Indonesian military leader during the Indonesian National Revolution
Taite Te Tomo (1883–1939), Maori politician in New Zealand

Given name
Tomo Gluić (born 1983), Croatian footballer
Tomo Križnar (born 1954), Slovene peace activist and writer
, Japanese shōjo manga artist
Tomo Milinović (Томо Милиновић, 1770–1846), Serbian revolutionary
, Japanese long-distance runner
Tomo in der Mühlen (born 1961), German/Croatian DJ/producer
, Japanese voice actress
Tomo Riba (1937-2000), Indian politician
, Japanese footballer
Tomo Virk (born 1960), Slovene literary historian and essayist
Tomo Vladimirski (Томо Владамирски, 1904-1971), Macedonian painter
Tomo Yasuda (fl. 2003–present), Japanese-American electronic musician
, 9th century Japanese court counsellor
Tomo Zdelarić (c. 1531-1572), earliest Jesuit priest from the Habsburg Kingdom of Slavonia

Nickname
Tomislav Tomo Česen (born 1959), Slovenian mountaineer
Tomislav Maretić (1854-1938), Croatian linguist and lexicographer
Tomo Miličević (born 1979), American lead guitarist of the alternative rock band 30 Seconds to Mars
, Japanese baseball pitcher
Tom Osander, referred to as "Tomo", drummer in the bands of Damien Rice and Lisa Hannigan
Tomislav Tomo Šokota (born 1977), Croatian retired footballer

Ring name
Tomo Michinoku, ring name of Tomoka Nakagawa (born 1981), Japanese professional wrestler

Fictional characters
Tomo Aizawa, from the manga series Tomo-chan Is a Girl!
Tomo Atena, from the video game Inazuma Eleven
Tomo Takino, from the manga series Azumanga Daioh
Tomo, from the video game The Phantom Menace
Tomo, from the manga series Fushigi Yûgi

Other uses
Tomo River, Colombia
Tomo, a New Zealand name for a sinkhole
Temporary open market operations (TOMO), an activity by a central bank to buy or sell government bonds on the open market

See also
Yeshiva Toras Moshe, a yeshiva in Israel often called To-Mo

Croatian masculine given names
Japanese unisex given names
Serbian masculine given names
Hypocorisms
Lists of people by nickname